Arthur Stuart, 7th Earl Castle Stewart, MC (6 August 1889 – 5 November 1961), styled Viscount Stuart from 1915 to 1921, was an Anglo-Irish peer and Unionist politician.

Background and education
Stuart was the third son of Andrew John Stuart, 6th Earl Castle Stewart, an Ulster Scots nobleman, and his wife, Emma Georgiana Diana, the youngest daughter of Major-General Arthur Stevens (1821–1895) of the Madras Native Infantry and his second wife (of five), Georgiana Eliza Dickson, a descendant of John Sheffield, 1st Duke of Buckingham and Normanby. The Stuart family descends in the male line from King Robert II of Scotland. 

He was educated at Charterhouse, Trinity College, Cambridge and the University of Paris.

Military and political career
Stuart fought in the First World War as a Major in the Machine Gun Corps, was mentioned in despatches and was awarded the Military Cross in the 1918 Birthday Honours. His two elder brothers were both killed in the First World War and in 1921, he succeeded his father as seventh Earl Castle Stewart. However, as this was an Irish peerage it did not entitle him to a seat in the House of Lords. He was elected to the House of Commons for Harborough in 1929 as a Conservative and Unionist, a seat he held until 1933.

Family
On 16 December 1920, then-Viscount Stuart married Eleanor May, daughter of Solomon Guggenheim. They had four sons, of whom the two eldest were killed in the Second World War. He committed suicide with a shotgun in his study at Old Lodge, his house and estate at Ashdown Forest near Uckfield on 5 November 1961, aged 72, and was succeeded in his titles by his third son, Arthur Stuart, 8th Earl Castle Stewart. Eleanor, Dowager Countess Castle Stewart died in 1992. After her death, Old Lodge was sold to H.H. Torki M Bin Saud Al Kabeer, a member of the royal family of Saudi Arabia.

References

Sources
Kidd, Charles, Williamson, David (editors). Debrett's Peerage and Baronetage (1990 edition). New York: St Martin's Press, 1990.

External links 
 

1889 births
1961 deaths
Earls in the Peerage of Ireland
British Army personnel of World War I
Machine Gun Corps officers
Suicides by firearm in England
Recipients of the Military Cross
Stuart, Arthur
Stuart, Arthur
Stuart, Arthur
UK MPs who inherited peerages
People educated at Charterhouse School
Alumni of Trinity College, Cambridge
British military personnel who committed suicide
British politicians who committed suicide
Guggenheim family